The Awatere River is a large river flowing through Marlborough, New Zealand. Flowing along the trace of the active Awatere Fault, it runs northeast through a straight valley to the west of the Inland Kaikoura mountains. This valley is parallel with that of the Waiau Toa / Clarence River,  to the south.

The New Zealand Ministry for Culture and Heritage gives a translation of "swift river" for Awatere.

Demographics

Awatere had a population of 1,617 at the 2018 New Zealand census, a decrease of 9 people (-0.6%) since the 2013 census, and an increase of 9 people (0.6%) since the 2006 census. There were 594 households. There were 855 males and 759 females, giving a sex ratio of 1.13 males per female. The median age was 42.8 years (compared with 37.4 years nationally), with 324 people (20.0%) aged under 15 years, 222 (13.7%) aged 15 to 29, 822 (50.8%) aged 30 to 64, and 246 (15.2%) aged 65 or older.

Ethnicities were 89.8% European/Pākehā, 13.2% Māori, 4.6% Pacific peoples, 1.9% Asian, and 1.7% other ethnicities (totals add to more than 100% since people could identify with multiple ethnicities).

The proportion of people born overseas was 13.5%, compared with 27.1% nationally.

Although some people objected to giving their religion, 51.6% had no religion, 37.7% were Christian, 0.2% were Muslim and 1.3% had other religions.

Of those at least 15 years old, 174 (13.5%) people had a bachelor or higher degree, and 249 (19.3%) people had no formal qualifications. The median income was $34,700, compared with $31,800 nationally. The employment status of those at least 15 was that 795 (61.5%) people were employed full-time, 231 (17.9%) were part-time, and 21 (1.6%) were unemployed.

Awatere River bridge

In 1887 the Awatere River was without any bridge crossing and at the time was noted by Parliament to be the only river not bridged between Picton and Bluff. Planning of a 325-metre joint road and rail bridge began in 1896, designed by Peter Seton Hay, and construction by Scott Brothers Ltd, a Christchurch based company, began two years after. Back in those times, bridge building lacked the modern engineering technology that is used today, and much of the construction was done via human and animal power. The laying of caissons which formed the foundations of the bridge was notoriously treacherous to workers at the risk of developing the bends due to long exposure of working in pressurised conditions. Construction was completed on 18 July 1901. The original road/rail bridge was opened on 10 October 1902. Construction took three years at the cost of £22,500. A further £118 was spent to add a wind break to protect trains.

State Highway 1 crosses the Awatere River at its current point just north of Seddon. The initial bridge remained the crossing until 2007 when most recently traffic signals were added to either direction to control vehicles on the platform, which was only wide enough for one lane of traffic. A new $15 million two-lane road bridge was constructed with the railway being the sole use of the original bridge.  The new road bridge opened to traffic in December 2008 and was officially opened on 31 January 2009. The vehicle deck on the original bridge was decommissioned as it was deemed too expensive to retain its use for pedestrians and cyclists.

References

External links

Awatere River information

Rivers of the Marlborough Region
State Highway 1 (New Zealand)
Rivers of New Zealand